Brian Seth Hurst a is chief storyteller and the president of StoryTech Immersive, an immersive content production, packaging and distribution company.

Background
Hurst was introduced to radio and television at an early age. He is the son of the Philadelphia radio and television personality Ed Hurst of the Steel Pier television show, Summertime on the Pier and in the 1950s WPEN Radio’s Grady & Hurst 950 Club. His mother, Sarajane Hurst, was Philadelphia’s first woman television producer. She was president of the Philadelphia chapter of American Women in Radio and Television. While in college, Hurst was assistant to the producer, his mother, while she produced several years of the Philadelphia segment of The Variety Club Telethon.

In 2006, Hurst developed and launched the Rapid Cross Media Initiative to assist broadcast clients to extend their programming to audiences and communities on new platforms. The vision, according to Hurst, was to allow for the maximization of assets and best-in-class technology vendors to "talk to each other" and to be efficiently integrated into the production process. As a consultant, Hurst promoted this idea while helping develop the original user experience for TiVo, a DVR and multi-room experience.

Work
Hurst coined the term "cross-platform" in 1998 as managing director of convergent media at Pittard Sullivan to describe client, TVGuide, brand and functionality presence across multiple platforms. He advocates for the concept of ongoing conversation and collaboration between the storyteller and the audience.

A proponent of "informed collaboration" between storytellers and technologists, Hurst is a member of the producing team for Tim Kring’s Conspiracy for Good, a fictional organization in an augmented reality drama popularizing the social benefits of storytelling by funding 50 scholarships and providing over 10,000 books for Zambian libraries through WeGiveBooks.org.

Immersive Content 
Hurst produced My Brother’s Keeper for PBS Digital Studios. The cinematic virtual reality (VR) experience was premiered on HTC Viveport at Sundance 2017 and was notable for its innovation in VR. It was the first film to shoot at 120fps allowing for true slow motion in VR, incorporated traditional cinematic techniques such as Bokeh, the combination of 360 and 180 stereoscopic in immersive storytelling and close-ups of less than 4 feet.

In September 2017, StoryTech Immersive announced its partnership with RMS Titanic Inc. for a 2018 expedition to the wreck and debris site of the Titanic for the purposes of further exploration, research and filming and capturing the wreck in virtual reality.

The Emmys
Hurst helped establish the Primetime Emmy for Interactive Television, which is how the Academy of Television Arts & Sciences’ Interactive Media Peer Group provides a forum for individuals contributing to the evolution of cross-platform engagement between creators and fans. Band of Brothers (HBO) won the first Outstanding Achievement In Interactive Television Programming award in 2002. Hurst was also one of ten recognized digital media executives profiled in Emmy Magazine in 2007.

He also spearheaded the initiative that extended Primetime Emmy eligibility to original programming distributed via broadband. as well as its advertising campaign "Welcoming Broadband to the World of Television" with print advertisements that used character stills from classic TV shows using laptops, which included computers, mobile phones, PDAs and similar devices.

Boards and awards
Hurst was a two-time governor and second vice-chair of the board of the Academy of Television Arts & Sciences. He also had three terms on the board of the Producers Guild of America and two terms as chairman and founding member of the organization’s New Media Council. Hurst was appointed global digital ambassador for the International Academy of Television Arts and Sciences in 2009.

Hurst was the recipient of an Interactive TV Today Award for "Leadership in Interactive Television" in 2006 and the lifetime achievement award in 2017.

Books authored
Hurst is author of WHOLE, a collection of essays that analyzes how our thoughts, beliefs and the way we feel serve to create our personal reality and our national and global realities.

He co-authored, with Olivia Newton-John, A Pig Tale, about a pig who, to his friends’ dismay, collects and saves many items that eventually turn into "the most beautiful thing".

References

Year of birth missing (living people)
Living people
Place of birth missing (living people)
American business executives